Leszek Roman Kucharski (born 1959) is a male Polish former international table tennis player.

He won a bronze medal at the 1985 World Table Tennis Championships in the Swaythling Cup (men's team event), a bronze medal at the 1987 World Table Tennis Championships in the men's doubles with Andrzej Grubba and a silver medal at the 1989 World Table Tennis Championships in the men's doubles with Zoran Kalinić.

He also won two English Open titles.

Kucharski was ranked world No. 11 at the end of 1986 and in mid-1987.

See also
 List of table tennis players
 List of World Table Tennis Championships medalists

References

Polish male table tennis players
Sportspeople from Gdańsk
Living people
1959 births
Table tennis players at the 1988 Summer Olympics
Table tennis players at the 1992 Summer Olympics
Olympic table tennis players of Poland
World Table Tennis Championships medalists